This is a list of the heritage sites in Simonstown as recognized by the South African Heritage Resources Agency.

|}

References 

Simonstown
Heritage sites, Simonstown
Heritage sites